Love, Summer and Music (German: Liebe, Sommer und Musik) is a 1956 Austrian-German musical comedy film directed by Hubert Marischka and starring Joe Stöckel, Fritz Heller and Rudolf Wasserlof.

The film's sets were designed by the art director Willy Schatz. It was shot in Agfacolor.

Cast
 Joe Stöckel as Ferdinand Lobmeier, Gastwirt 
 Fritz Heller as Simon Lobmeier, Bürgermeister 
 Rudolf Wasserlof as Toni Rinnertaler, Schüler der Forstakademie 
 Dorit Kreysler as Resi Rinnertaler, Tonis Schwester 
 Jutta Günther as Bettina Bertoni, Jazzsängerin 
 Isa Günther as Netti, ihre Zwillingsschwester 
 Heinz Conrads as Hugo Hasenbichl, Jazzmusiker 
 Joseph Egger as Alois Rinnerthaler, der großvater 
 Karl Friedrich as Sänger 
 Theodor Grieg
 Rudi Hofstätter as Sänger 
 Wolfgang Jansen as Emil Buschke 
 Anton Karas as Zitherspieler 
 Lonny Kellner as Sängerin 
 Paul Kuhn as Sänger 
 Hugo Lindinger
 Lotte Martens as Vroni, Kellnerin 
 Claus Schmidt as Michl, Bauernbub 
 Mimi Schwarz

References

Bibliography
 Thomas Elsaesser & Michael Wedel. The BFI companion to German cinema. British Film Institute, 1999.

External links 
 

1956 films
1956 musical comedy films
German musical comedy films
West German films
Austrian musical comedy films
1950s German-language films
Films directed by Hubert Marischka
1950s German films